The Nieuw Ensemble ( or ; English: New Ensemble) is a Dutch musical ensemble.

It was founded in 1980 in Amsterdam. It has a unique instrumental structure, using plucked instruments such as mandolin, guitar and harp in combination with wind, string and percussion. Ed Spanjaard has been the principal conductor since 1982.

Almost 500 pieces have been written for the ensemble.

The ensemble has dedicated programmes to the works of a single composer, such as Luciano Berio, Pierre Boulez, Elliott Carter, Franco Donatoni, Brian Ferneyhough, Mauricio Kagel, Ton de Leeuw, György Kurtág, Theo Loevendie and Luigi Nono.

Since 1991, programmes featuring new works written especially for the ensemble by Chinese composers such as Tan Dun, Qu Xiao-Song, Xu Shuya, Chen Qigang and Guo Wenjing have appeared. In 1997, the group toured China with concerts in Shanghai and Beijing.

The Nieuw Ensemble has performed at the Venice Biennale.

The Nieuw Ensemble also participates in the Atlas Ensemble, a chamber orchestra with musicians from a number of different countries.

References

External links 
 

Dutch musical groups
1980 establishments in the Netherlands
Contemporary music organizations